The commune of Kayokwe is a commune of Mwaro Province in central Burundi. The capital lies at Kayokwe.

References

Communes of Burundi
Mwaro Province